Melaleuca ochroma is a plant in the myrtle family, Myrtaceae, and is endemic to the south-west of Western Australia. It is very similar to Melaleuca subfalcata, varying mainly in the length of its stamens and styles. Like M. subfalcata, it has pink to mauve flowers and leaves that are very hairy when young but become glabrous when mature.

Description
Its leaves are narrow oval shaped and covered with soft hairs when young but become glabrous with age and eventually linear in shape, slightly dished and with a sharp point on the end.

The stamens are arranged in five bundles around the flower, each bundle containing 13 to 24 stamens. (In Melaleuca subfalcata, the stamens and styles are longer.)

Taxonomy and naming
Melaleuca ochroma was first described as a new species in 2000 by Brendan Lepschi. The specific epithet (ochroma) is from the Greek ochroma meaning "pallor" in reference to the pale colour of the flowers.

Distribution and habitat
Melaleuca ochroma occurs in the Mount Holland - Hyden district in the Coolgardie and Mallee biogeographic regions.

Conservation
Melaleuca ochroma is listed as "Priority Three" Government of Western Australia Department of Parks and Wildlife meaning that it is only known from a few locations but is not under imminent threat.

References

ochroma
Myrtales of Australia
Plants described in 2000
Endemic flora of Western Australia